Colin Baxter is a Scottish curler.

He was also a two-time Scottish Schools champion (1968, 1969).

Teams

Personal life
His brother Iain was also a curler and Colin's teammate. Their parents, father Bobby and mother Mabel, were curlers too.

References

External links
 

Living people
Scottish male curlers
Scottish curling champions
Year of birth missing (living people)